Jane Bowman was an American singer. Her 1961 rockabilly tough gal song, "Mad Mama", concerned an overly jealous mate. Bowman wrote "Mad Mama".

Discography
"Dearest Little Angel", B-side "Coming Down With The Blues" (June 1961)
"Eternally", B-side "Mad Mama" (November 1961)

References

Year of birth missing (living people)
Possibly living people
American rockabilly musicians
American women country singers